The Elbe Valley ( or Elbetal) is most often used as a term for that section of the river valley in which most of the quarters of Dresden are located. The Dresden Elbe Valley was declared a UNESCO World Heritage Site in 2005 and has lost the title June 25, 2009 due to a dispute between UNESCO and the City of Dresden. The city plans to construct bridge across the Elbe river, that will span it in the middle of the former World Heritage Site. In the opinion of UNESCO this construction will "deface" the historic site.

There are several other "Elbe valleys", however, including that near the Elbe's source in the Giant Mountains area in the Czech Republic.

Valleys of Saxony